Ortadoğu is a Turkish political news website which began as a daily newspaper on 3 May 1972. Ortadoğu is often associated with the Nationalist Movement Party. The print edition of the newspaper was ended on 17 February 2020, but it continues to operate as a website.

References

1972 establishments in Turkey
2020 disestablishments in Turkey
Daily newspapers published in Turkey
Defunct newspapers published in Turkey
Nationalist newspapers
Newspapers established in 1972
Publications disestablished in 2020
Turkish-language newspapers